A cup of tea is a single serving of the beverage tea. Informally, it may be rendered "a cuppa". The idiom "one's cup of tea" refers to a preference; often it is in the negative, so "X is not really my cup of tea" means "I don't like X."

"Cup of Tea" may also refer to:
 "Cup of Tea", a song by The Verve Pipe, from the 1996 album Villains
 Cup of Tea (album), a 2000 album by Irish traditional band Sláinte
 My Cup of Tea, a 2007 album by Hacken Lee
 My Cup of T, a 2007 EP by Theresa Fu

See also
 Three Cups of Tea, a 2006 best seller book by Greg Mortenson and David Oliver Relin
 A Cup of Tea, a 1922 short story by Katherine Mansfield